Fionán Murray (born 1979 in Cork, Ireland) is an Irish sportsperson. He plays Gaelic football with his local club St Finbarr's and was a member at senior level of the Cork county team from 1998 until 2004.

References

1979 births
Living people
Cork inter-county Gaelic footballers
Munster inter-provincial Gaelic footballers
St Finbarr's Gaelic footballers